is a JR West Kabe Line station located in Yagi, Asaminami-ku, Hiroshima, Hiroshima Prefecture, Japan.

Station layout
Kami-Yagi Station features one side platform handling one bidirectional track. The station is unmanned, and contains an automatic ticket machine.

Platforms

History
1910-12-25: Station opens under the name of Ōtagawabashi
1929-12-02: The track around Ōtagawabashi Station is electrified 
1936-09-01: The station is renamed to Kami-Yagi Station when the Kabe line is nationalized
1987-04-01: Japanese National Railways is privatized, and Kami-Yagi Station becomes a JR West station
2008-03-15: Platform is extended to allow 4 car trains to stop

Surrounding area
 Japan National Route 54
Hiroshima Municipal Yagi Elementary School
Ōta River

References

External links

 JR West

Kabe Line
Hiroshima City Network
Stations of West Japan Railway Company in Hiroshima city
Railway stations in Japan opened in 1910